Henry Weale VC (2 October 1897 – 13 January 1959) was a Welsh recipient of the Victoria Cross, the highest and most prestigious award for gallantry in the face of the enemy that can be awarded to British and Commonwealth forces.

He was 20 years old, and a Lance-Corporal in the 14th Battalion, Royal Welsh Fusiliers, British Army during the First World War when the deed took place for which he was awarded the VC.

He later achieved the rank of sergeant. The Army Reserve centre in Queensferry, North Wales is now named the Henry Weale VC Hall. He was born in Shotton, Flintshire and is buried at Rhyl. In 2010 a memorial garden was opened in Shotton in memory of Henry Weale.

The medal
His Victoria Cross is displayed at the Royal Welch Fusiliers Museum, Caernarfon Castle, Gwynedd, Wales.

References

Monuments to Courage (David Harvey, 1999)
The Register of the Victoria Cross (This England, 1997)

External links
Location of grave and VC medal (Clwyd, Wales)

1897 births
1959 deaths
People from Shotton, Flintshire
British World War I recipients of the Victoria Cross
Royal Welch Fusiliers soldiers
British Army personnel of World War I
British Army recipients of the Victoria Cross
Welsh recipients of the Victoria Cross
Burials in Wales
Military personnel from Flintshire